Heinz Czechowski (7 February 1935 – 21 October 2009) was a German poet and dramatist.

At the age of ten, Czechowski survived the highly destructive bombing of his birthplace of Dresden. After training in surveying and graphic design, he studied at the Johannes R. Becher Institute of Literature in Leipzig, where he was strongly influenced by Georg Maurer and the Saxon school. His first published poems appeared in 1957 in an issue of Neue Deutsche Literatur. From 1961 to 1965, he worked at the Mitteldeutscher Verlag publishing house in Halle, Saxony-Anhalt. Between 1971 and 1973, he wrote plays for the city of Magdeburg, after which he became a freelance writer.

Czechowski produced free translations of the work of foreign poets (e.g. Anna Akhmatova, Mikhail Lermontov, Marina Tsvetaeva, and Yiannis Ritsos). He was a founding member of the Leipzig Free Academy of the Arts.

Works
Nachmittag eines Liebespaares.  Poems, 1962
Sieben Rosen hat der Strauch. Mitteldeutscher Verlag, 1964 (anthology)
Zwischen Wäldern und Flüssen. Mitteldeutscher Verlag, 1965 (anthology)
Unser der Tag, unser das Wort. Mitteldeutscher Verlag, 1966 (anthology)
Wasserfahrt. Poems, 1967
Spruch und Widerspruch. Prose, 1974
Schafe und Sterne. Poems, 1975
Was mich betrifft. Poems, 1981, 
Von Paris nach Montmartre. 1981, 
Ich, beispielsweise. Poems, 1982
An Freund und Feind. Poems, 1983, 
Herr Neithardt geht durch die Stadt. 1983, 
Kein näheres Zeichen. Mitteldeutscher Verlag, 1987, 
Sanft gehen wie Tiere die Berge neben dem Fluß. 1989
Die überstandene Wende. 1989
Mein Venedig. Poems and prose, 1989, 
Auf eine im Feuer versunkene Stadt. 1990, 
Nachtspur. Poems and prose, 1993, 
Gedichte und Poeme. 1996
Mein westfälischer Frieden. Ein Zyklus. Nyland-Stiftung, 1998, 
Sauerländische Elegie. 1998
Ich und die Folgen. Rowohlt, 1998, 
Das offene Geheimnis. 1999, 
Die Zeit steht still. Poems, Grupello Verlag, 2000,  
Wüste Mark Kolmen. Poems, Ammann Verlag, 2000, 
Seumes Brille. Gedichte aus der Schöppinger Chronik (1999/2000). UN ART IG Verlag, 2000, 
Einmischungen. Grupello Verlag, 2000, 
Seumes Brille.  Grupello Verlag, 2002, 
Der Garten meines Vaters. Grupello Verlag, 2003, 
Die Elbe bei Pieschen und andere Ortsbeschreibungen. 
Unstrutwärts. 
Von allen Wundern geheilt. Gedichte. onomato Verlag, 2006, 
Die Pole der Erinnerung. Autobiographie. Grupello Verlag, 2006,

Prizes 
 1961: Kunstpreis der Stadt Halle
 1970: Goethepreis der Stadt Berlin (collective prize)
 1976: Heinrich-Heine-Preis des Ministeriums für Kultur der DDR
 1984: Heinrich Mann Prize der Akademie der Künste der DDR
 1990/1991: Stadtschreiber von Bergen
 1996: Hans-Erich-Nossack-Preis des Kulturkreises der deutschen Wirtschaft
 1998: Dresdner Stadtschreiber
 1999: Dr. Manfred Jahrmarkt-Ehrengabe der Deutsche Schillerstiftung
 2001: Brüder-Grimm-Preis der Stadt Hanau

Bibliography 
Renatus Deckert: Ruine und Gedicht. Das zerstörte Dresden im Werk von Volker Braun, Heinz Czechowski und Durs Grünbein, Thelem Verlag, Dresden 2010.

External links 
Wolfgang Ertl zu Czechowskis Werk seit der Wende

1935 births
2009 deaths
German male poets
German male dramatists and playwrights
20th-century German poets
20th-century German dramatists and playwrights
German-language poets
20th-century German male writers